Where the West Begins is a 1919 American silent Western film directed by Henry King and starring William Russell, Eileen Percy and Cullen Landis.

Cast
 William Russell as Cliff Redfern 
 Eileen Percy as Prudence Caldwell 
 Cullen Landis as Ned Caldwell 
 Frederick Vroom as Luther Caldwell 
 Carl Stockdale as Gunner McCann 
 Al Ferguson as Blackthorn Kennedy

References

Bibliography
 Donald W. McCaffrey & Christopher P. Jacobs. Guide to the Silent Years of American Cinema. Greenwood Publishing, 1999.

External links
 

1919 films
1919 Western (genre) films
Films directed by Henry King
1910s English-language films
Pathé Exchange films
American black-and-white films
Silent American Western (genre) films
1910s American films